Baidyabati Municipality is the civic body that governs Baidyabati and its surrounding areas (Sheoraphuli and partly Chatra) in Srirampore subdivision of Hooghly district, West Bengal, India.

History
Baidyabati Municipality was established in 1869.

Geography
Baidyabati Municipality covers an area of 12.03 sq km and has a total population of 121,110 (2011).

In 1981, 25.00% of the total population formed main workers and 75.00% were non-workers in Baidyabati Municipality and 27.00% of the total main workers were industrial workers. This may be interpreted as follows: although industrial activities are prominent in the municipal areas of the region, the major portion of the population is commuters and migrants find employment in the area.

Elections
In the 2015 municipal elections for Baidyabati Municipality Trinamool Congress won 13 seats, CPI (M) 1 seat, Forward Bloc 3 seats, Congress 3 seats and  Independents 3 seats.

In the 2010 municipal elections for Baidyabati Municipality Trinamool Congress won 12 seats, CPI (M) 4 seats, Forward Bloc 3 seats and Congress won 3 seats.

About the 2010 municipal elections, The Guardian wrote, "Today's municipal elections are unlike any for decades: the Communists, who have held West Bengal's main towns almost without a break since the 1970s, are facing disaster… This time defeat is likely to be definitive and could signal the beginning of the end for the Communist Party of India-Marxist (CPIM)."

In the 2005 municipal elections for Baidyabati Municipality, CPI (M) won 8 seats, Forward Block 4 seats,  Congress 6 seats and Trinamool Congress 4 seats.

References

 

Municipalities of West Bengal